= Pipaliya Jahirpeer =

- Village
- Location within Madhya Pradesh Location within India
- Coordinates: 23.3105704°N 77.4859711°E
- Country: India
- State: Madhya Pradesh
- District: Bhopal
- Tehsil: Huzur
- Elevation: 499 m (1,637 ft)

Population (2011)
  - Total: 1,388
- Time zone: UTC+5:30 (IST)
- ISO 3166 code: MP-IN
- 2011 census code: 482426

Pipaliya Jahirpeer is a village in the Bhopal district of Madhya Pradesh, India. It is located in the Huzur tehsil and the Phanda block.

== Demographics ==
According to the 2011 census of India, Pipaliya Jahirpeer has 283 households. The effective literacy rate (i.e. the literacy rate of population excluding children aged 6 and below) is 72.58%.

Demographics (2011 Census)
	Total	Male	Female
Population	1388	744	644
Children aged below 6 years	192	108	84
Scheduled caste	395	209	186
Scheduled tribe	71	40	31
Literates	868	508	360
Workers (all)	560	377	183
Main workers (total)	235	222	13
Main workers: Cultivators	102	99	3
Main workers: Agricultural labourers	95	91	4
Main workers: Household industry workers	5	3	2
Main workers: Other	33	29	4
Marginal workers (total)	325	155	170
Marginal workers: Cultivators	125	54	71
Marginal workers: Agricultural labourers	186	92	94
Marginal workers: Household industry workers	2	1	1
Marginal workers: Others	12	8	4
Non-workers	828	367	461
